Faustino (Fausto) Leali (born 29 October 1944, Nuvolento, Brescia, Italy) is an Italian pop singer.

Early life
Leali began his musical career as a singer in several bands in his native Brescia. His first guitar teacher was Tullio Romano, of the band Los Marcellos Ferial.

Career
Leali's first release was a 1962 promotional single as "Fausto Denis", for the magazine Nuova Enigmistica Tascabile. He then joined the Novelty, a Beat band formed by Franco Piacibello (saxophone), Delio Ombrella (drums), Silvio Pesce (bass) and Piero Braggi (guitar) in Alessandria that had already released an EP in 1961. With the group he managed to obtain a recording contract with the Music record label, and release a few singles, including two covers of Beatles –"Please Please Me" and "Lei ti ama" ("She Loves You"). Leali's big opportunity came in 1966 when A&R executive Ezio Leoni moved from Music record label to Ri-Fi, bringing Leali and the Novelty with him.

Leali and The Novelty's first success was "A chi" ("To whom"), in 1967, an Italian version of a 1954 American song "Hurt", written by Roy Hamilton. "A chi" sold over one million copies, and was awarded a gold disc.  In the same year, Leali took part for the first time in the music festival Un disco per l'estate, with the song "Senza di te" ("Without you"), but did not progress beyond the first round.

In 1969, 1971, and 1974, he appeared again in Un disco per l'estate with the songs "Tu non meritavi una canzone" ("You did not deserve a song"), "Si chiama Maria" ("Her name is Maria"), and "Solo lei" ("Only you"). He returned to the hit parade in 1976 with the single "Io camminerò" ("I will go"), which reached the top of charts, and in 1980 with a performance of Totò's song "Malafemmena" ("Bad woman" in Napolitan).

In the late 1980s, he made several appearances at the Sanremo festival; in 1987, with "Io amo" ("I love"), that came in 4th; in 1988, with "Mi manchi" ("I miss you") at 5th; and in 1989, in the duet with Anna Oxa "Ti lascerò" ("I'll leave you") that won 1st place.

The same year, Oxa and Leali represented Italy in the Eurovision Song Contest with "Avrei voluto" ("I wanted to"). The song was voted in the 9th place. Leali returned to Sanremo in 2002, with "Ora che ho bisogno di te" ("Now that I need you"), a duet with Luisa Corna, and the next year with "Eri tu" ("It was you"), which eventually went platinum.

After taking part in 2006 in the Rai Due reality show, Music Farm, where he reached the finals, Leali released a new album, Profumo e Kerosene (Perfume and Kerosene), with ten new songs, all in a new for him musical style.

Due to his naturally hoarse singing style, Leali was nicknamed by the Italian media  Il negro bianco, "the white negro", also the title of his 1968 album.

Personal life
Ιn 1968, Leali married the singer Milena Cantù, who was with the record company founded by Adriano Celentano. They had a daughter, Deborah, so named after the success of the eponymous song of that year's Festival di Sanremo, sung at the competition in a duet with Wilson Pickett (it came in fourth place).

Selected discography

Albums
1964 Fausto Leali
1966 Fausto Leali e i suoi Novelty
1968 Il negro bianco
1975 Amore Dolce, Amore Amaro, Amore Mio
1976 Io camminerò
1977 Leapoli
1981 Un attimo di blu
1992 Saremo promossi
1994 Anima nuda
2002 Secondo me ... io ti amo
2006 Profumo e Kerosene
2016 Non sono Leali

Singles

Filmography
I ragazzi dell'Hully Gully (1964)
Escort in Love (2011)

References

External links

  
 
 

 

1944 births
Living people
Musicians from the Province of Brescia
Italian male singers
Italian pop singers
Eurovision Song Contest entrants for Italy
Eurovision Song Contest entrants of 1989
Sanremo Music Festival winners
CBS Records artists
Philips Records artists